Lions Peak is a prominent hill in the eastern foothills of the Santa Cruz Mountains in southwest Santa Clara County, California. The landmark lies west of San Martin, and is adjacent to the resort village of  CordeValle. The headwaters of Lions Creek originate on the eastern flank of the hill, and flow southward before merging with Llagas Creek in Gilroy.

History 
The land surrounding the peak, once part of the historic Rancho San Francisco de las Llagas, was purchased by Messrs Lion and Buckley in the late 19th century.

In the summer of 2008, dry lightning ignited fires northwest of the hill, burning nearly  nearby.

See also 
 List of summits of the San Francisco Bay Area

References

External links
 

Mountains of Santa Clara County, California
Mountains of the San Francisco Bay Area
Mountains of Northern California